Nikolai Alekseyevich Sokolov (born 18 January 1983) is a former Russian professional footballer.

Club career
He made his debut for FC Lokomotiv Moscow on 29 March 2003 in a Russian Premier League Cup game against FC Torpedo-Metallurg Moscow and he also appeared in the return leg of the matchup.

He played in the Russian Football National League for FC Baltika Kaliningrad in 2004.

References

1983 births
Footballers from Tambov
Living people
Russian footballers
Association football forwards
FC Lokomotiv Moscow players
FC Baltika Kaliningrad players
FC Spartak Moscow players
FC Khimki players
Russian expatriate footballers
Expatriate footballers in Belgium
FC Znamya Truda Orekhovo-Zuyevo players